The 1972 Prize of Moscow News was the seventh edition of an international figure skating competition organized in Moscow, Soviet Union. It was held December 9–13, 1972. Medals were awarded in the disciplines of men's singles, ladies' singles, pair skating and ice dancing. Sergei Chetverukhin won the men's title for the third consecutive year. Canada's Cathy Lee Irwin took the ladies' title ahead of West Germany's Isabel de Navarre and the Soviet Union's Tatiana Oleneva. Irina Vorobieva / Alexander Vlasov defeated Olympic champions Ludmila Belousova / Oleg Protopopov for gold in the pairs' category. In the ice dancing category, world champions Lyudmila Pakhomova / Alexander Gorshkov won their fourth gold medal at the event.

Men

Ladies

Pairs

Ice dancing

References

1972 in figure skating
Prize of Moscow News